Lost Decade may refer to:

 Lost Decade (Peru), the economic, political and social crisis that took place in Peru in the 1980s
 Lost Decades, an economic crisis in Japan that began in the 1990s
 The Lost Decade, a television series broadcast by the BBC
 La Década Perdida or The Lost Decade, the economic crisis in Latin America in general, specifically in Mexico, in the 1980s
 2000s in economics, dubbed as a "lost decade" for the United States

See also
 China's Lost Decade: The Politics and Poetics of the 1980s, a book by Gregory B. Lee
 Lost Years (disambiguation)